Terhune–Gardner–Lindenmeyr House is located in Paramus, Bergen County, New Jersey, United States. The house was built in 1707 and was added to the National Register of Historic Places on February 7, 1972.

See also
National Register of Historic Places listings in Bergen County, New Jersey

References

Houses on the National Register of Historic Places in New Jersey
Federal architecture in New Jersey
Houses completed in 1707
Houses in Bergen County, New Jersey
Paramus, New Jersey
National Register of Historic Places in Bergen County, New Jersey
New Jersey Register of Historic Places
1707 establishments in New Jersey